Danger Woman is a 1946 American crime film directed by Lewis D. Collins and written by Josef Mischel. The film stars Don Porter, Brenda Joyce, Patricia Morison, Milburn Stone, Samuel S. Hinds and Kathleen Howard. It was released on July 12, 1946 by Universal Pictures.

Plot

Cast        
Don Porter as Claude Ruppert
Brenda Joyce as June Spenser
Patricia Morison as Eve Ruppert
Milburn Stone as Gerald King
Samuel S. Hinds as Dr. Albert Sears
Kathleen Howard as Eddie
Griff Barnett as Dr. George Carey
Charles D. Brown as Inspector Pepper
Ted Hecht as Lane
Leonard East as Howard

References

External links
 

1946 films
1940s English-language films
American crime films
1946 crime films
Universal Pictures films
Films directed by Lewis D. Collins
American black-and-white films
1940s American films